The North Carolina Department of Environmental Quality (NCDEQ) is an agency of the government of North Carolina that focuses on the preservation and protection of natural resources and public health. The Department is headed by the Secretary of Environmental Quality, who is appointed by the Governor of North Carolina and is a member of the North Carolina Cabinet. The Department of Environmental Quality was formed in 2015 and it was preceded by the Department of Environmental and Natural Resources, which was formed in 1971 by the North Carolina Executive Reorganization Act. The current secretary is Elizabeth Biser, who was appointed to the role by Governor Roy Cooper.

History
The Department was originally established as the Department of Environmental and Natural Resources by the North Carolina Reorganization Act of 1971.

Divisions 
Current Divisions of the NCDEQ include:
 Air Quality 
 Coastal Management 
 Energy, Mineral, and Land Resources
 Environmental Assistance and Customer Service
 Environmental Education and Public Affairs
 Marine Fisheries
 Legislative and Intergovernmental Affairs
 Mitigation Services
 Waste Management
 Water Infrastructure
 Water Resources
 Financial Services
 General Counsel
 Human Resources
 Stewardship Program

Secretaries
The Secretaries of the Department of Environmental Quality have included:
 Elizabeth Biser, July 2021 until present
 Dionne Delli-Gatti (acting), March 2021 until June 2021
 Michael S. Regan, January 2017 until March 2021.
 Donald R. van der Vaart, January 2015 until December 2016.

As the Department of Environmental and Natural Resources, the Secretaries included the following:
 John E. Skvarla, III, 2013 - 2014
 Dee A. Freeman, 2009 - 2013
 William G. Ross, Jr., 2001 - 2009
 William E. Holman, 1999 - 2001
 Wayne McDevitt, 1997 - 1999
 Jonathan B. Howes, 1993 - 1997
 William W. Cobey, Jr., 1989 - 1993
 S. Thomas Rhodes, 1985 - 1988
 James A. Summer, 1984 - 1985
 Joseph W. Grimsley, 1981 - 1983
 Howard N. Lee, 1977 - 1981
 George W. Little, 1976 - 1977
 James E. Harrington, 1973 - 1976
 Charles W. Bradshaw, Jr., 1971 - 1973
 Roy G. Sowers, 1971

Marine Patrol
The North Carolina Marine Patrol is part of the Division of Marine Fisheries. The mission of the Marine Patrol is to "ensure sustainable marine and estuarine fisheries for the benefit of the people of North Carolina". The patrol have jurisdiction over the coastal waters of the state, up to three miles offshore, and up to 200 miles offshore in respect of some federally-regulated species. Carter Witten was appointed colonel of the Marine Patrol in February 2019.

The Marine Patrol are responsible for ensuring compliance with state rules and regulations relating to fisheries and fishing. The work of the Patrol is divided into three districts (Northern, Central and Southern) and an aviation section. Officers are responsible for regulating and inspecting commercial and recreational fishermen, and also provide a general patrol service on waterways, piers, and beaches in coastal areas. The Patrol are also responsible for providing inspection services through the fish supply chain, including wholesalers and restaurants.

References

Government of North Carolina
State environmental protection agencies of the United States
Department of Environment and Natural Resources
Natural resources agencies in the United States
Environmental Quality
Government agencies with year of establishment missing